The 1979 Oyo State gubernatorial election occurred on July 28, 1979. UPN candidate Bola Ige won the election.

Results
Bola Ige representing UPN won the election. The election held on July 28, 1979.

References 

Oyo State gubernatorial elections
Oyo State gubernatorial election
Oyo State gubernatorial election